Springtime in Texas is a 1945 American Western film directed by Oliver Drake and written by Frances Kavanaugh. The film stars Jimmy Wakely, Dennis Moore, Lee "Lasses" White, Marie Harmon, Rex Lease and Pearl Early. The film was released on June 2, 1945, by Monogram Pictures.

Plot

Cast          
Jimmy Wakely as Jimmy Wakely
Dennis Moore as Denny Moore
Lee "Lasses" White as Lasses White
Marie Harmon as Kitty Stevens
Rex Lease as Pete Grant
Pearl Early as Prunella Bumstead
Horace Murphy as Mayor Lem Grainger
I. Stanford Jolley as Marshal Set Rawlins 
Wally Wales as Red Higgins
Budd Buster as Jed Stevens
Roy Butler as Sam Monroe
Johnny Bond as Johnny Bond
Frankie Marvin as Frankie Marvin

References

External links
 

1945 films
American Western (genre) films
1945 Western (genre) films
Monogram Pictures films
Films directed by Oliver Drake
American black-and-white films
1940s English-language films
1940s American films